Nestor Gomes (born October 1909, date of death unknown) was a Brazilian middle-distance runner. He competed in the men's 800 metres at the 1932 Summer Olympics.

References

1909 births
Year of death missing
Athletes (track and field) at the 1932 Summer Olympics
Brazilian male middle-distance runners
Olympic athletes of Brazil
Athletes from São Paulo